APIA Leichhardt Football Club, also known simply as APIA (Associazione Poli-sportiva Italo Australiana), is a semi-professional soccer club based in the suburb of Leichhardt in Sydney, Australia. The club was formed in 1954 as APIA Leichhardt, by Italian Australians. APIA, winner of the national Australian championship of 1987, is currently a member of the NPL NSW.

History
The club was founded as the Associazione Poli-sportiva Italo Australiana ("APIA") in 1954 by members of the Italian-Australian community in Sydney's Inner West. After several years in the Canterbury District competition, the club joined the NSW Federation's state league.

In the 1960s APIA became one of the foremost soccer clubs in Australia and won the Premiership of NSW of the years 1964, 1966, 1967 and 1975, which was the highest level of achievement in the absence of a national competition. Between 1966 and 1974 APIA also won three times the State Cup of NSW, then named after a sponsor Ampol Cup. The 1974 final was considered "one of the most incredible finals" of the history of the club when skipper Jimmy Rooney and centreforward Peter Ollerton, who scored five goals, won 9–1 against Auburn in front of a crowd of 5210 at Wentworth Park, the highest finals result ever.

Rooney and Ollerton were also in the team that represented Australia a few months later in its first World Cup participation in Germany.

In 1979 APIA was given access to the National Soccer League, the top tier of Australian soccer since 1977.  In 1987 APIA won the national championship, six points ahead of the Preston Makedonia Soccer Club from Melbourne, with then only two points awarded per win. The coach in that season was Rale Rasic. Charlie Yankos and Peter Katholos are probably the best known players from that side. The main cast of that year consisted of Tony Pezzano; Charlie Yankos, Arno Bertogna, Mark Brown, Jean-Paul de Marigny, Peter Tredinnick, Peter Katholos, Edward Lorens, Hilton Phillips, Gary Ward, Rod Brown and Tony Parison. In 1988 APIA won the National Soccer League Cup. By 1992 the APIA Leichhardt was overwhelmed by financial difficulties. The club was somewhat restructured and forthwith played on state level with the moniker "Tigers."

In 2017, APIA won the National Premier Leagues NSW premiership, but lost the grand final to Manly United FC on penalties. APIA also made the grand final of the 2017 Waratah Cup, but lost 3–1 to Hakoah Sydney City East FC.

In 2018, APIA won the 2018 Waratah Cup. On 21 August 2018, APIA defeated reigning A-League champions Melbourne Victory FC in the Round of 16 of the 2018 FFA Cup, becoming the seventh state-league side to beat a top-tier team in the knockout tournament. The result was billed as one of the biggest upsets in the tournament's history.

In 2019, APIA won the National Premier Leagues NSW Grand Final with a 2-1 victory over Sydney United. This was the first final ever played at Bankwest Staidum.

When the Football Federation Australia repealed its controversial National Club Identification Policy, which effectively banned clubs from having ethnic identities APIA dropped the "Tigers" moniker and reverted to its original badge.

Venues

Lambert Park in Leichhardt is the club's traditional home ground. It was opened in 1954 and has, over the years, been used for most of the club's home games. It is still APIA's main ground and hosts all of the club's NPL matches. APIA has also hosted home games at a number of other venues, including Wentworth Park, Leichhardt Oval and Henson Park.

Current squad
Updated 5 February 2023.

Seasons 

 Key to league competitions
 Div. 1 = Division One
 NSL = National Soccer League
 NSWSL = NSW Super League
 NSWPL = NSW Premier League
 NPL NSW = National Premier Leagues NSW
 P Draws went to penalty shoot-outs during the 1993–1995 seasons (2 points for win, 1 point for loss).
 <div id="1">1 Stage 1 of 1996 NSW Super League
 <div id="2">2 Stage 1 of 1996 NSW Super League 

Key to position colours and symbols

 Key to cup competitions
 AMP = Ampol Cup
 NPLF = National Premier Leagues Finals

 Key to cup and finals results
 1R, 2R, 3R...7R = 1st Round, 2nd Round, 3rd Round...7th Round
 GS = Group Stage
 EF = Elimination Final
 PF = Preliminary Final
 PO = Playoff Final
 R32 = Round of 32
 R16 = Round of 16
 QF = Quarterfinals
 SF = Semifinals
 RU = Runners-Up
 W  = Winners
 Unk = Result unknown

Correct as of 13th March 2023

Source OzFootball

Honours

Regional
National Premier Leagues NSW
Premiers (5): 1964, 1966, 1967, 1975, 2017 
Runners-Up (11): 1959, 1960, 1963, 1974, 1976, 1977, 1997, 2002–03, 2015, 2018, 2019

National Premier Leagues NSW Grand Finals
Championships (6): 1964, 1965, 1969, 1976, 2002–03, 2019
Runners-Up (7): 1959, 1963, 1966, 1967, 1975, 2017, 2018,

Waratah Cup
Winners (5): 1962, 1966, 1975, 2013, 2018 
Runners-Up (3): 2006, 2012, 2017

Jonny Warren Cup
Winners (1): 2007

Ampol Cup
Winners (3): 1966, 1970, 1974

Domestic
National Soccer League
Premiers (1): 1987 National Soccer League
Champions (1): 1987

Australia Cup
Winners (1): 1966
Runners-Up (3): 1964, 1965, 1967
NSL Cup
Winners (2): 1982, 1988

Notes

References

External links
 
 Oz Football Profile
 NPL NSW Fixtures & Results

National Premier Leagues clubs
National Soccer League (Australia) teams
New South Wales Premier League teams
Association football clubs established in 1954
1954 establishments in Australia
 
Italian-Australian backed sports clubs of New South Wales